Bąki may refer to the following places in Poland:
Bąki, Lower Silesian Voivodeship (south-west Poland)
Bąki, Łódź Voivodeship (central Poland)
Bąki, Masovian Voivodeship (east-central Poland)
Bąki, Opole Voivodeship (south-west Poland)